Rząsiny , until 1945 Wilcza-Góra is a village in the administrative district of Gmina Gryfów Śląski, within Lwówek Śląski County, Lower Silesian Voivodeship, in south-western Poland.

References

Villages in Lwówek Śląski County